CGM (an initialism for Cherish God More, Constantly Getting Money, Certified Grove Members etc.), is a British hip hop collective based in Ladbroke Grove, London specifically the Portobello Estate. They were formerly known as 1011, named after the W10 and W11 postal codes. They are considered to be one of the pioneers of the UK drill scene.

History
In 2015, Digga D formed the UK drill group 1011 along with his friends in a local youth club in Ladbroke Grove. They released several singles from 2016-17 including: "Kill Confirmed", "Play for the Pagans", and "No Hook". The group has since been banned from making music together and later rebranded as CGM, an acronym for Cherish God More, Constantly Getting Money, Certified Grove Members etc.

Current members
The list below includes confirmed members of CGM

 Digga D
 Dodgy (also known as AP; formerly Itchy)
 Horrid1 (also known as Huncho)
 MSkum
 Rack5
 Sav'o (also known as Jsav)
 D2traps
 Splasha
 Kizzle
 Ice
 JDF
 (CGM) Striker
 (CGM) TY
 (CGM) ZK (formerly Eleven)

Former members

 JDF
 Loose1 (formerly KaySav)
 Sini Sayso

Legal issues
On 9 November 2017, Digga D and members of 1011 were arrested in a stop and search in which they were carrying machetes and baseball bats. 1011 claimed they were making a drill music video, but police stated they were planning to attack a rival gang, 12World. Digga and 1011 were convicted of conspiracy to commit violent disorder, sentenced to a year in jail, and was given a Criminal Behaviour Order (CBO) in 2018 that required the group to have the Metropolitan Police's permission before releasing any new music, forbade them from using London postcodes, and banning references in lyrics to real-life incidents and people. Four of the group's music videos prior to the CBO were taken down, however, they were noted to have amassed over ten million combined views before removal.

The CBO ban issued to 1011 was condemned by the campaign group Index on Censorship and widely described as entirely unprecedented. Digga's lawyer noted that the CBO "gives the police and probation the ability to control and censor his art." The Metropolitan Police has since denied it was censorship. Det Ch Supt Kevin Southworth said at the time: "When in this instance you see a particular genre of music being used specifically to goad, to incite, to provoke, to inflame, that can only lead to acts of very serious violence being committed, that’s when it becomes a matter for the police. We're not in the business of killing anyone's fun, we're not in the business of killing anyone's artistic expression - we are in the business of stopping people being killed."

Discography

Mixtapes
 Horrid1 and Sav'o - Violent Siblings (2022)
Horrid1 and Sav'o - Evil brothers     (2022)

References

Hip hop collectives
English hip hop groups
UK drill musicians
Rappers from London